Tarakanova is a 1930 French historical drama film directed by Raymond Bernard and starring Édith Jéhanne, Paule Andral and Olaf Fjord. It depicts the life of Princess Tarakanoff the pretender to the throne of Catherine II in Eighteenth Century Russia.

Cast
 Édith Jéhanne - Tarakanova / Soeur Dosithée 
 Paule Andral - L'Impératrice Catherine II 
 Olaf Fjord - Le Comte Alexis Orlof 
 Rudolf Klein-Rogge - Le Comte Chouvalof 
 Charles Lamy - Le Prince Charles Kradziwell 
 Camille Bert - L'Amiral Greigh 
 Antonin Artaud - Le jeune tzigane 
 Ernest Ferny - Le Comte Potemkine 
 Andrew Brunelle - Kansoff

See also
 Princess Tarakanova (1910)
 Princess Tarakanova (1938)
 Shadow of the Eagle (1950)
 The Rival of the Empress (1951)

References

Bibliography
 Powrie, Phil & Rebillard, Éric. Pierre Batcheff and stardom in 1920s French cinema. Edinburgh University Press, 2009

External links

1930 films
1930s historical drama films
French historical drama films
1930s French-language films
Films directed by Raymond Bernard
Films set in Russia
Films set in the 18th century
French black-and-white films
Films about Catherine the Great
1930s French films